

Bannalpsee is a reservoir in the municipality of Wolfenschiessen in the Swiss canton of Nidwalden.

The construction of the reservoir was decided in 1934 and completed in 1937. The reservoir is operated by Elektrizitätswerk Nidwalden.

The lake can be reached by a cable car from Oberrickenbach, which in turn is linked by post bus service to Wolfenschiessen station on the Luzern–Stans–Engelberg railway line.

See also
List of mountain lakes of Switzerland

References

External links
Swissdams: Bannalp
Fabienne Künzli:  

Lakes of Nidwalden
Bannalp
RBannalp